Fernando Sylvan (Díli, 26 August 1917—Cascais, 25 December 1993) was a poet and a writer from East Timor.

He spent almost all his life in Portugal. The distance between Portugal and Timor didn't prevent him writing about the traditions, the legends and the folklore of his homeland.  He is considered among the greatest writers in Portuguese and he was a member and the president of the Sociedade de Língua Portuguesa.

External links 
 Artigo mais completo sobre literatura timorense e literatura de Timor, incluindo Fernando Sylvan

East Timorese writers
East Timorese poets
1917 births
1993 deaths
People from Dili
20th-century poets